George Tony Dunst (born October 17, 1984) is an American professional poker player and a two-time World Series of Poker (WSOP) bracelet winner.

Poker career
Dunst was born in Milwaukee, Wisconsin and studied theater at the University of Wisconsin-Milwaukee. He worked as a waiter before turning to poker and spent time living in Australia, China, and Malaysia before settling in Las Vegas, Nevada. He began playing online poker in 2003 after watching the 2002 WSOP on television. Playing under the name 'Bond18,' he has amassed more than $1.8 million in online tournament winnings.

Dunst first played in the WSOP in 2006, finishing in 198th place in the Main Event. His first bracelet came in 2016, when he defeated a field of 2,452 players in a $1,000 No Limit Hold'em event and earned $339,000. He dedicated his bracelet to his wife Sharon. He won his second bracelet in July 2020 at the WSOP Online in a $777 No Limit Hold'em 6-Handed event. Overall, Dunst has $1.2 million in career WSOP earnings.

His biggest live tournament cash came at the Aussie Millions Main Event in January 2016. Dunst nearly didn't play the tournament after losing a $5,000 chip while waiting in line to register, but fellow poker player Mike McDonald offered to pay his buy-in for him. Dunst eventually finished runner-up in the tournament to Ari Engel, earning A$1,000,000 ($700,000 US).

World Poker Tour
In 2010, Dunst became host of the Raw Deal segment on World Poker Tour broadcasts, offering analysis of hands played at each final table. He won the season 12 WPT Caribbean event in November 2013. Dunst has made a further five WPT final tables, including three times in the WPT Championship, finishing runner-up to Ole Schemion in 2019. Dunst replaced Mike Sexton as a WPT commentator alongside Vince Van Patten in 2017.

As of 2019, Dunst has more than $3.8 million in live tournament winnings.

World Series of Poker bracelets

An "O" following a year denotes bracelet(s) won during the World Series of Poker Online

References

External links
Hendon Mob profile
WSOP.com profile
WPT profile

1984 births
American poker players
World Series of Poker bracelet winners
World Poker Tour winners
People from Milwaukee
People from Wisconsin
Living people